The 2022 Colorado Buffaloes football team represented the University of Colorado Boulder as a member of the Pac-12 Conference during the 2022 NCAA Division I FBS football season. The Buffaloes played their home games on campus at Folsom Field in Boulder, Colorado. After losing the first five games of the season, third-year head coach Karl Dorrell and defensive coordinator Chris Wilson were fired on October 2; offensive coordinator Mike Sanford Jr. was named the interim head coach of the Buffaloes for the remainder of the season, who named Clay Patterson as the offensive coordinator and Gerald Chatman as the defensive coordinator.

The Buffaloes finished the season with only one win over California in overtime, their first one-win season since 2012 and their fourth since 1917. This was one of the worst seasons in program history as Colorado lost all but three games by at least 25 points.

After the season on December 3, Deion Sanders was hired as the head coach for 2023. A Hall of Fame cornerback in the National Football League (NFL), he was previously the head coach for three years at Jackson State of the Southwestern Athletic Conference (SWAC).

Previous season

The Buffaloes finished the 2021 season at 4–8 (3–6 in Pac-12, fifth in South Division).

Schedule
The Colorado Buffaloes and the Pac-12 announced the 2022 football schedule on December 16, 2021.

Roster

Game summaries

TCU

at Air Force

at Minnesota

UCLA

at Arizona

California

at Oregon State

Arizona State

No. 8 Oregon

at No. 8 USC

at No. 17 Washington

No. 14 Utah

References

Colorado
Colorado Buffaloes football seasons
Colorado Buffaloes football